Hajji Gholamreza (also Romanized as Ḩājjī Gholāmrez̤ā) is a village in Shirin Su Rural District, Maneh District, Maneh and Samalqan County, North Khorasan Province, Iran. At the 2006 census, its population was 135, in 26 families.

References 

Populated places in Maneh and Samalqan County